Streptomyces graminisoli is a bacterium species from the genus of Streptomyces which has been isolated together with Streptomyces rhizophilus from rhizosphere soil from the plant Sasa borealis.

See also 
 List of Streptomyces species

References

Further reading

External links
Type strain of Streptomyces graminisoli at BacDive -  the Bacterial Diversity Metadatabase

graminisoli
Bacteria described in 2014